At least two ships of the French Navy have been named Protet:

 , a  launched in 1898 and struck in 1910.
 , a  launched in 1913 and scrapped in 1933.

French Navy ship names